Chapoania dentigera is a species of moth of the family Tortricidae. It is found in Los Lagos Region, Chile.

References

Moths described in 1999
Euliini
Taxa named by Józef Razowski
Moths of South America
Endemic fauna of Chile